Juan Fernando Perdomo Bueno (born 27 January 1957) is a Mexican politician affiliated with the Citizens' Movement. As of 2014 he served as Deputy of the LIX Legislature of the Mexican Congress as a plurinominal representative.

References

1957 births
Living people
Politicians from Veracruz
Members of the Chamber of Deputies (Mexico)
Citizens' Movement (Mexico) politicians
Monterrey Institute of Technology and Higher Education alumni
21st-century Mexican politicians
People from Córdoba, Veracruz
Deputies of the LIX Legislature of Mexico